State Route 120 (SR 120) is a  state highway in Tallapoosa County in the east-central part of the U.S. state of Alabama. The western terminus of the highway is at an intersection with SR 49 in the unincorporated community of Reeltown. The eastern terminus of the highway is at an intersection with SR 14 west of Notasulga.

Route description

It travels generally to the southeast and is routed along a two-lane road. It serves as a connector between SR 49 and SR 14.

Major intersections

See also

References

120
Transportation in Tallapoosa County, Alabama